Williamsport is an unincorporated community in Morrow County, in the U.S. state of Ohio.

History
Williamsport was laid out in 1836 by William Dakan, and named for him. A nearby post office operated under the name Andrews. This post office was established in 1833, and was discontinued in 1903.

References

Unincorporated communities in Morrow County, Ohio
1836 establishments in Ohio
Populated places established in 1836
Unincorporated communities in Ohio